The Tanzanian Honours System consists of orders and medals awarded for exemplary service to the nation. It is presented by the President of Tanzania on national holidays.

Orders

Medals

Campaign Medals

See also 

 Arusha Declaration
 Uhuru Torch

References

Tanzania and the Commonwealth of Nations
 
Society of Tanzania